All India Secondary School Examination, commonly known as board exams, is a centralized public examination that students in schools affiliated with the Central Board of Secondary Education in India and elsewhere take after class 10. The board conducts the examination during the period of February every year even after implementing the ambitious project of Continuous and Comprehensive Evaluation. Now that the board has ended the Continuous and Comprehensive Evaluation pattern as a result Joint Employment Test, NEET, etc., the exam is conducted by the National Testing Agency instead. In this exam, Mathematics, Science (Physics, Chemistry, Biology) and Social Science (History, Geography, Political Science, Economics) are compulsory with any two languages (official language of medium and foreign/schedule languages). Students can also opt skill subject such as information technology, painting, yoga, music or artificial intelligence. Successful candidates are awarded the Secondary School Completion Certificate, a Statement of Marks, and a Migration Certificate stating that the candidate has completed Secondary Schooling and can pursue higher education. For the 2016-17 academic year, the Central Board of Secondary Education has revived the old system of syllabus and marking scheme (complete syllabus for All India Secondary School Examination and marks out of 500 (in COVID time out of 200) India has state exams and central exams.

The examination and effects of Continuous and Comprehensive Evaluation
The exams, commonly called 'board exams', take place with great enthusiasm in India. Children used to study in a stream of evaluation called the Continuous and Comprehensive Evaluation. This method had been put into force by the then Union HRD minister Kapil Sibal to reduce the stress on students.

According to the new trend-setter, the entire year had been divided into two semesters. Each semester had two Formative tests and one summative test.
The exam previously was held at the end of the year, but with the semester pattern, the exam is divided into halves. The first half was from April–September and the second half was from October–March.

Starting in academic year 2017-18, the Continuous and Comprehensive Evaluation scheme has been replaced by the traditional system.

Exam components
Each subject is marked out of a total of 90 (theoretical/written) and 10 marks for practical assessment techniques such as assignments, classroom projects, and presentations. According to the new pattern, each subject is marked out of a total of 80 (theoretical), and the remaining 20 marks (internal assessment) are divided into 5 for the practical assessment, 5 for notebook submission and 10 for practice tests conducted autonomously by schools affiliated to the Central Board of Secondary Education.

From the academic year 2019-20, the Central Board of Secondary Education changed this pattern where 80 marks for theory are the same but increased the number of questions and provide more internal choices in the paper. Also, to tackle rote learning in schools, they decreased the weight of Tests from 10 to 5 and increased the marks of assignment to 15 (Multiple assessments and Portfolio)

Each candidate gives either five or six exams, each of 100 marks and the best five subjects are taken into the consideration. English and regional language are compulsory to be included. They are marked out of 500 marks and then the percentage is taken out.

Students are required to get a minimum score of 40 out of 100 in every subject to successfully pass the examination.

Post-Examination
In India, schools and junior colleges often consider All India Secondary School Examination scores for admission to higher secondary disciplines (humanities, sciences, commerce or vocational courses) in the absence of admission tests. Thus the exams turn to be the deciding factor in deciding in which stream will the student be comfortable.

SSC
Some states in India (e.g., Andhra Pradesh, Gujarat, Goa, Madhya Pradesh, Maharashtra, Tamil Nadu, Telangana, West Bengal, Karnataka, Kerala) conduct their own secondary school examination, in the pattern of the local state board, known as Secondary School Certificate (SSC) and it is also known as Secondary School Leaving Certificate (SSLC) and Matriculation. At the end of the academic year the board examinations conducted by both national and state boards such as The CBSE's "All India Secondary School Examination" (AISSE), CISCE's ICSE Examination and the various state boards "Secondary School Certificate"(SSC), "Secondary School Leaving Certificate"(SSLC) and Matriculation Examinations for Class 10th are one and the same and are equivalent to the General Certificate of Secondary Education taken by students in the UK.

Scheme of evaluation in other national boards
Central Board of Secondary Education and other central boards such as Council for the Indian School Certificate Examinations and National Institute of Open Schooling have schools which follow their scheme of education all over the country.

See also 
 All India Senior School Certificate Examination
 Junior Science Talent Search Examination

References

External links
 More about the number of education boards approved by the Indian government
 Official Website of Central Board of Secondary Education
 Official Website of CISCE
 Official Website of National Institute of Open Schooling
 Official Website of IBSE

School qualifications of India
School examinations in India
Educational institutions in India with year of establishment missing